Mount Hope is an unincorporated community in Walker County, Alabama, United States.

Notes

Unincorporated communities in Walker County, Alabama
Unincorporated communities in Alabama